Warpath is the twenty-second studio album by Japanese rock band Boris. It was first announced via the band's Facebook page on April 30, along with simultaneous releases of Urban Dance and Asia. They were first available on tour with Endon, making their release date May 2.

The album is entirely instrumental drone and noise experimentation, very similar to Asia and most of Urban Dance as well as past albums such as The Thing Which Solomon Overlooked - Chronicle.

Curiously, the cover art posted by the band is inaccurate to the physical product, which features a young Japanese girl dressed as a ballerina.

Track listing

Personnel
 Atsuo
 Wata
 Takeshi

References

External links
Discogs release page

2015 albums
Boris (band) albums